Polu Sarkan (also Romanized as Polū Sarkān, Polū Serkān, and Poloosarkan; also known as Pol-e Sergān and Pul-i-Sarkān) is a village in Chaharduli-ye Gharbi Rural District, Chaharduli District, Qorveh County, Kurdistan Province, Iran. At the 2006 census, its population was 354, in 89 families. The village is populated by Kurds.

References 

Towns and villages in Qorveh County
Kurdish settlements in Kurdistan Province